Gata Velha Ainda Mia is a 2013 Brazilian drama thriller film written and directed by Rafael Primot and starring Regina Duarte, Bárbara Paz and Gilda Nomacce. The film showed as hors-concours at the 2013 Festival do Rio and showed at the LA Indie Film Fest.

Plot
Gloria Polk (Regina Duarte) is a decadent bitter old writer, who decides at last to open her house to Carol (Bárbara Paz), a young journalist who lives in the same apartment building, and give her an interview about her return to literature after a long break. The film portrays a feminine drama which slowly becomes a thriller, with suspense and a surprising ending. The film talks about women and their difficulties concerning relationship, ageing and also writers' maddening creation process.

Cast
 Regina Duarte as Gloria Polk
 Bárbara Paz as Carol
 Gilda Nomacce as Dida

References

External links
 

2013 films
Brazilian thriller drama films
2013 thriller drama films
2013 directorial debut films
2013 drama films